"Fallin' In Love" is a song recorded and released by the trio of Hamilton, Joe Frank & Reynolds. The song was written by band member Dan Hamilton.

Charts
Released in the summer of 1975, the song became the group's second Top 10 hit on the Billboard Hot 100 chart in the U.S. (following 1971's "Don't Pull Your Love" which peaked at #4), and it was their only song to reach the #1 position on this chart. It was also the only pop #1 hit for the Playboy Records label.

"Fallin' in Love" was also a #1 hit on the adult contemporary chart in the U.S. for one week in 1975.  In addition, the song reached number twenty-four on Billboards Hot Soul Singles chart.

Weekly charts

Year-end charts

Copyright-infringement litigation
In a lawsuit that its attorneys filed June 24, 2010, Playboy Enterprises litigated against Drake for copyright infringement by over allegations that his breakout selection, "Best I Ever Had," sampled "Fallin' in Love" without attribution or permission. The suit named Drake, as well as Cash Money Records and Universal Music Group, as respondents, and it asserted that Playboy "has suffered, and will continue to suffer irreparable injury" from the alleged infringement. The lawsuit demanded that "all infringing works be recalled and destroyed."

As part of its claim, Playboy also alleged that "each defendant either knew, or should have reasonably known, that the sound recording was protected by copyright."

La Bouche version

Overview 
"Fallin' in Love" was covered in 1995 by German Eurodance duo La Bouche. It was the third single of their debut album, Sweet Dreams (1995), and was released in June 1995, although the song did not gain popularity in the United States until the following year following the success of the first two singles, "Be My Lover" and "Sweet Dreams". Though it did well in several countries, it achieved a minor success in comparison with previous releases. It reached number four in Finland and Hungary, and was a top 20 hit in Austria, Belgium, Germany, Iceland, the Netherlands, Sweden and Switzerland. On the Eurochart Hot 100, "Fallin' in Love" peaked at number 20.

This song has had remix versions. The album version is a midtempo pop-soul number that is faithful to the original Hamilton, Joe Frank and Reynolds version with some additional lyrics; however, the version that was released late in 1996 to US Top 40 radio, was a dance remix.

Critical reception
John Bush from AllMusic described the song as "an R&B/house groover". J.D. Considine from The Baltimore Sun said, "Listen to Melanie Thornton work her way through the likes of "Fallin' In Love" or "Do You Still Need Me", and it's clear that she has the voice of a classic soul singer." Larry Flick from Billboard wrote that the German duo gives the 1975 pop hit by Hamilton, Joe Frank & Reynolds "a springy pop/dance spin that will fit top 40 and crossover formats like a comfy glove. Front woman Melanie Thornton has an appropriately flashy delivery that shines atop the track's shuffling rhythms, while partner Lane McCray's rap interludes are pleasant—if not gratefully unobtrusive." He also stated that Thornton is "adding glass-shattering drama to its oh-so-slick arrangement of bright synths and chunky beats." 

Dave Sholin from the Gavin Report felt that the two "make this new version sparkle. Already bolstered by a substantial amount of airplay, this production has everything in place to be hit number three for this twosome." Pan-European magazine Music & Media commented, "Have a "mouthful" of sultry soul the old-fashioned way. The beat and rap bridge are a sign of a modern product, while the intro to the Full Harmony Club Mix, a dialogue between the Hamilton couple, is even more sexy." A reviewer from Music Week gave the song four out of five, adding, "Pop dance balladry from the self-styled Eurogroovers, whose hooky continental hit is also making its mark on the US club chart." James Hamilton from the RM Dance Update wrote that Thornton's "outstanding soulfully joyful wailing Mariah Carey-ish vocal performance" makes it "potentially a UK number one smash too now". 

Chart performance
"Fallin' in Love" was a major hit on the charts on several continents, although it didn't reach the same level of success as "Sweet Dreams" and "Be My Lover". In Europe, it entered the top 10 in Finland and Hungary, peaking at number four in both. Additionally, it was a top 20 hit in Austria (13), Belgium (15), Germany (13), Iceland (20), the Netherlands (14), Sweden (19) and Switzerland (13), as well as on the Eurochart Hot 100, where it peaked at number 20 in September 1995. Additionally, "Fallin' in Love" went into the top 30 in France (24) and Ireland (27), and the top 50 in Scotland (41) and the United Kingdom. In the latter, it peaked at number 43 in its first week at the UK Singles Chart, on September 24, 1995. It was also the last single by the band to chart in the UK. Outside Europe, it peaked at number four on the RPM Dance/Urban chart and number 39 on the Top Singles chart in Canada, and number three on the Billboard Hot Dance Club Play in the United States. In Oceania, "Fallin in Love" reached number 33 in New Zealand and number 39 in Australia.

Music video
A music video was produced to promote the single in summer of 1995, featuring the duo performing both inside and outside of a villa. In between, there is a storyline of a young couple falling in love and eventually getting married. The video was later published by Vevo on YouTube in August 2015, and had generated more than 1.2 million views as of February 2023.

Track listings
 CD single "Fallin' in Love" (radio version) — 3:30
 "Fallin' in Love" (full harmony club mix) — 4:50

 CD maxi (June 12, 1995) "Fallin' in Love" (radio version) — 3:30
 "Fallin' in Love" (full harmony club mix) — 4:50
 "Fallin' in Love" (Melody-La Bouche chant. club mix) — 5:15
 "Fallin' in Love" (the wedding club mix) — 4:20
 "Fallin' in Love" (crazy wedding club mix) — 4:40
 "Fallin' in Love" (franks house mix) — 5:52
 "Fallin' in Love" (spike house mix) — 5:22
 "Fallin' in Love" (fallin' in dub) — 6:21

 12" maxi'''
 "Fallin' in Love" (franks house mix) — 5:52
 "Fallin' in Love" (the wedding club mix) — 4:20
 "Fallin' in Love" (Melody-La Bouche chant. club mix) — 5:15
 "Fallin' in Love" (spike house mix) — 5:22

Charts

Weekly charts

Year-end charts

External links

Popular culture
The song was featured in the 2007 film The Hitcher''.

See also
List of Hot 100 number-one singles of 1975 (U.S.)

References

External links
 Fallin' in Love: Rare live version recorded at a Mission Hills, CA club
 

1975 singles
Hamilton, Joe Frank & Reynolds songs
1995 singles
Billboard Hot 100 number-one singles
Cashbox number-one singles
American soft rock songs
La Bouche songs
Playboy Records singles
1975 songs
Songs written by Dan Hamilton (musician)